Dani Espinar (born 15 February 2000) is a professional Spanish footballer who plays as an midfielder for A.C. Este.

Club career

ŠKF Sereď
Espinar made his Fortuna Liga debut on 9 February 2021 at ViOn Aréna in a fixture against Pohronie. He was featured in the starting line-up and was replaced by Denis Potoma after about an hour of play. Soon after his substitution, Pohronie took the lead through an own goal by Martin Mečiar and after 70 minutes of play Alieu Fadera increased the lead to and sealed the final score at 0:2 for Pohronie, which was the teams second victory in the season.

References

External links
 
 Futbalnet profile

1995 births
Living people
Footballers from Málaga
Spanish footballers
Association football midfielders
Real Valladolid Promesas players
CD El Ejido players
Real Balompédica Linense footballers
CD Alhaurino players
Mérida AD players
SD Tarazona footballers
Vélez CF players
ŠKF Sereď players
A.C. Este players
Segunda División B players
Tercera División players
Slovak Super Liga players
Serie D players
Expatriate footballers in Slovakia
Spanish expatriate sportspeople in Slovakia
Expatriate footballers in Italy
Spanish expatriate sportspeople in Italy